Dacrydium is a genus of conifers belonging to the podocarp family Podocarpaceae. Sixteen species of evergreen dioecious trees and shrubs are presently recognized. The genus was first described by Solander in 1786, and formerly included many more species, which were divided into sections A, B, and C by Florin in 1931. The revisions of de Laubenfels and Quinn (see references), reclassified the former section A as the new genus Falcatifolium, divided Section C into new genera Lepidothamnus, Lagarostrobos and Halocarpus, and retained Section B as genus Dacrydium.

Species

Distribution
The natural range of Dacrydium extends from New Zealand, New Caledonia,  Fiji and the Solomon Islands through Malesia (New Guinea, Indonesia, Malaysia and the Philippines), to Thailand and southern China.

References

de Laubenfels, David J. 1969. A revision of the Melanesia and Pacific rainforest conifers, I. Podocarpaceae, in part. Journal of the Arnold Arboretum 50:274-314. 
Quinn, C.J. 1982. Taxonomy of Dacrydium Sol. ex Lamb. emend. de Laub. (Podocarpaceae). Australian Journal of Botany 30: 311-320.

 
Podocarpaceae genera
Dioecious plants